Orzysz (English pronunciation) is a town in northeastern Poland, in the Pisz County, Warmian-Masurian Voivodeship, with 7,512 inhabitants (2007). It is located on Orzysz Lake in the region of Masuria.

A garrison of the Polish Armed Forces is located in Orzysz, and there is a proving ground near the town.

History

The location of the town has been inhabited for a long time. In 1895 remains of a settlement dated to  300-1000 AD were discovered near the town on the shores of Lake Orzysz. The present settlement was founded by Wawrzyniec Polak, who in 1443 was allowed to establish the settlement by the Grand Master of the Teutonic Order Konrad von Erlichshausen. In 1454, Polish King Casimir IV Jagiellon incorporated the region to the Kingdom of Poland upon the request of the anti-Teutonic Prussian Confederation, and the Thirteen Years' War broke out. After the Peace of Toruń in 1466 it became part of Poland, as a fief held by the Teutonic Knights. A local parish was established in 1544, and its first preacher was named Maciej.

After Reformation until 1702 church services in the only church were conducted in the Masurian dialect of Polish, spoken by the ethnically Polish majority of the town's population. A year earlier, in 1701, the settlement became part of the Kingdom of Prussia. It was subjected to Germanisation policies, and in 1796 a local Prussian official filed a complaint against the local parish pastor for not complying with these policies and continuing schooling in Polish.

The population of Arys in 1740 was 640, and in 1782 about 900. The population of Arys slowly increased. There were 85 craftsmen recorded in 1775, a majority of them shoemakers. The town, located on a trading route, was granted city rights in 1725 by Frederick William I of Prussia. The town has been militarily occupied frequently. During the Seven Years' War it was held by Russian troops for four years. During Napoleonic Wars, French and Russian troops were quartered in the town in 1806-1807. A fire destroyed almost the entire town in 1826. The town became impoverished as a result of the fire and the collapse of the local economy.

According to Kingdom of Prussia records, in 1834 Poles constituted a slight majority of residents – 600 compared to 502 Germans, however anyone who knew the German language was counted as ethnically German by the Prussian authorities. On the other hand, only around 100 inhabitants did not speak Polish, according to other sources. In the second half of the 19th century, the town slowly developed again and its population grew. The populace remained predominantly Polish by ethnicity and Protestant by confession, and in the late 19th century the local parish was composed of 4,450 Poles and 1,000 Germans.

20th century
During World War I, several battles were fought between the German and Russian armies in 1914 and 1915 in the area of Arys. The town was held by Russian troops for 20 days and heavily damaged.

On July 11, 1920, the East Prussian plebiscite, mandated by the Versailles Treaty, was held in the District of Allenstein (now Olsztyn), which included Arys. District-wide results were 1,480 votes for Germany and only 1 (one) vote for Poland.

In July 1920, a German internment camp for Polish troops was established in the town during the Polish–Soviet War. Some Poles tried to escape and during such attempts three were killed by the Germans, plus three more died in the camp due to epidemics. In August 1920, Poles were deported to Königsberg and then Minden, for Russians to take their place in the camp.

Towards the end of World War II Arys was nearly destroyed in the Soviet January offensive. After the flight of the majority of the population, there were only 300 people remaining in the town in January 1945, mostly Masurians (Poles). Orzysz became again part of Poland under the border changes promulgated at the Potsdam Conference in July–August 1945, and the remaining Polish inhabitants were joined by Poles displaced from former eastern Poland annexed by the Soviet Union and from other places.

Transport
Orzysz is located at the crossroads of Polish National roads 16 and 63.

Sports
It competes in the lower leagues.

Notable residents
 Kurt Sanderling (1912-2011), German conductor
 Wolfgang Heyda (1913-1947), German U-boat commander
 Mariusz Patyra (born 1977) Polish violinist

References

Cities and towns in Warmian-Masurian Voivodeship
Pisz County